Kupine is an album by the Serbian noise-rock band Klopka Za Pionira, released in 2006 (see 2006 in music) on the Ne-ton independent label. This is one of the more experimental and ambient sounding albums by Klopka, containing long, slowly developing songs with many ambient nature-like sounds but also various machine noises and loops. The album contains very few lyrics, appearing now and then in some of the songs.

It also contains the first version of the song "Šta me gledaš" which a year later appeared on the album Svinje and became a live standard for the band.

The name of the album is the Serbian for blackberries.


Track listing
All lyrics by Mileta Mijatović and music by Klopka Za Pionira
"Elka" – 5:58
"Civilizacija" – 4:44
"Elka12" – 3:54
"Šta me gledaš" – 1:29
"Kupine" – 10:31
"Elka17" – 3:34
"Palestina" – 2:41
"Elka16" – 9:19

Personnel
Mileta Mijatović - vocals 
Damjan Brkić - guitar, drum machine
Vladimir Lenhart - bass guitar, tapes

References

External links 
 Free streaming of all songs on the official website

Klopka Za Pionira albums
2006 albums